Longevity fruit may refer to the fruit of:

 Siraitia grosvenorii
 Lycium species:
 Lycium barbarum
 Lycium chinense
 Arachis hypogaea

Longevity